Alexander Morgan (born 30 January 1959) is a Jamaican cricketer. He played in two first-class and three List A matches for the Jamaican cricket team in 1983/84.

See also
 List of Jamaican representative cricketers

References

External links
 

1959 births
Living people
Jamaican cricketers
Jamaica cricketers
Cricketers from Kingston, Jamaica